Kitkot or Katkot is a village located in Mamund Tehsil, Bajaur District, Khyber Pakhtunkhwa, Pakistan. The population is 7,398 according to the 2017 census.

References 

Populated places in Bajaur District